The boron cycle is the biogeochemical cycle of boron through the atmosphere, lithosphere, biosphere, and hydrosphere.

Atmospheric and terrestrial fluxes

Boron in the atmosphere is derived from soil dusts, volcanic emissions, forest fires, evaporation of boric acid from seawater, biomass emissions, and sea spray. Sea salt aerosols are the largest flux to the atmosphere. On land, boron cycles through the biosphere by rock weathering, and wet and dry deposition from the atmosphere.

Ocean fluxes
The marine biosphere circulates a large reservoir of boron. Dissolved boron is delivered to the ocean by river transport, wet deposition, submarine groundwater discharge, and hydrothermal vents. Boron is lost from the oceans in emissions from the ocean surface, deposition of organic materials and sediments (mostly carbonates), and the subduction of ocean sediment.

Anthropogenic impacts
The boron cycle has been significantly impacted by human activity. Major anthropogenic fluxes are coal mining and combustion, oil production, emissions from industrial factories, biofuels, landfills, and mining and processing of boron ores. Anthropogenic boron fluxes to the hydrosphere and atmosphere have increased and anthropogenic fluxes now exceed the natural boron fluxes.

Notes

References 

Biogeochemical cycle
Boron